In Great Britain and former British colonies, a Victorian house generally means any house built during the reign of Queen Victoria. During the Industrial Revolution, successive housing booms resulted in the building of many millions of Victorian houses which are now a defining feature of most British towns and cities.

In the United Kingdom, Victorian houses follow a wide range of architectural styles. Starting from the early classicism inherited from Regency architecture, the Italianate style gained influence in the 1840s and 1850s, and the Gothic Revival style became prevalent by the 1880s. Later in the Victorian era, the Queen Anne style and the Arts and Crafts movement increased in influence, resulting in the transition to styles typically seen in Edwardian houses. Victorian houses are also found in many former British colonies where the style might be adapted to local building materials or customs, for example in Sydney, Australia and Melaka, Malaysia.

The Victorian Society is a membership charity which campaigns for Victorian architecture.  

In the United States, Victorian house styles include Second Empire, Queen Anne, Stick (and  Eastlake Stick), Shingle, Richardsonian Romanesque, and others.

Great Britain
Early in the Victorian era, up to the 1840s houses were still influenced by the classicism of Regency styles. However the simplicity of Regency classicism fell out of favour as affluence increased and by the 1850s the Italianate style influenced domestic architecture which now incorporated varying quantities of stucco. From the 1850s domestic buildings also became increasingly influenced by the Gothic Revival, incorporating features such as pointed, projecting porches, bay windows, and grey slate.

Typical features
In addition to general architectural influences, this progressive change in style resulted from several other factors. In the 1850s, the abolition of tax on glass and bricks made these items cheaper yet a suitable material and the coming of the railway allowed them to be manufactured elsewhere, at low cost and to standard sizes and methods, and brought to site. There was also progressive introduction from the 1850s of various building regulations. There are a number of common themes in Victorian housing:

 Sanitation: regulations were introduced progressively from the 1850s to raise the importance of sanitation features, including correct drainage, waste facilities (the "ash pit" or "dust bin"), and toilet facilities either in the form of an outside privy or inside water closet.
 Hot and cold water: at the start of the Victorian era, some houses had running tap water and a boiler for hot water. By the turn of the century, hot and cold running water were a common feature.
 Lighting powered by gas was available in many towns from the start of the Victorian era.  By the end of the Victorian era, many houses had gas.
 A basement with a cellar for the storage of coal, required for open fires and to heat water.
 Sash windows but with larger panes of glass, from the 1850s, than the characteristic 6 plus 6 smaller panes seen in Georgian and Regency architecture.
The brick chimney was a prominent feature in Victorian homes, consisting of a fireplace, chimney breast and chimney stack that protruded above the roof line to exhaust smoke.
 Victorian houses were generally built in terraces or as detached houses.
 Building materials were brick or local stone. Bricks were made in factories some distance away, to standard sizes, rather than the earlier practice of digging clay locally and making bricks on site.
 The majority of houses were roofed with slate, quarried mainly in Wales and carried by rail. The clay tiles used in some houses would be available locally.
 Vegetation and small garden were often incorporated into Victorian homes, as forms of nature were prized by the suburban domestic ideal.

Houses for all classes
In Victorian times, population growth, and the Industrial Revolution which saw a migration of workers from the countryside to the cities, resulted in successive housing booms in the 1850s and 1870s that saw the creation of millions of houses.  These catered not only for the rich and the new "middling-classes" but also for the poor.

In deprived areas, Victorian houses were often very small, for example, back-to-back houses built in extremely cramped conditions.  Some of these areas became slums or 'rookeries', and were later cleared. Some smaller, two-up two-down houses still survive, for example in Salford, Greater Manchester.

Victorian houses for the middle classes and upwards tended to have accommodation for servants, often employed to carry out the considerable labour required to keep the house, including its fireplaces, clean and well stocked.

Victorian houses of the middle and upper classes aspired to follow the purest forms of contemporary architecture, for example, the Gothic Revival or Queen Anne styles.

Great houses

The Victorian era, together with the Edwardian era was the last sustained period in which great houses were built in large numbers.  Many of these harked back to earlier periods of English architecture, for example:

Waddesdon Manor in Renaissance Revival style 
Highclere Castle in Tudorbethan style (link says it's actually Jacobethan)
Harlaxton Manor in Jacobethan style
Canford manor following the medieval style and incorporating a great hall
Penrhyn Castle in Norman style
Mentmore Towers in Jacobethan style
Tyntesfield in Gothic Revival style

North America
Victorian-era homes in eastern American cities tend to be three stories and those in western American cities tend to be two-story houses or one-story cottages. This is not representative of a typical Victorian-era home in all regions.

Although the general public often incorrectly refers to a Victorian-era house as a Victorian-style house, Victorian era refers to a time period and not to a style. Although architectural historians generally agree that about eight primary architectural styles were prominent in the United States and Canada during the Victorian era, Victorian-era residential architecture in the United States and Canada was a procession of styles borrowed from countries and historical styles.

One feature that became popular in the Victorian era was the use of wooden gingerbread trims to create ornate embellishments to decorate their homes. This was a reinterpretation of European Gothic Revival architecture using timber that was abundantly available in North America. With the invention of steam-powered scroll saw, the gingerbread trims could be produced en masse. The popularity started in the east in 1870 and spread to the west five to ten years later.

Examples

Australia
In Australia, eight styles predominated for homes in the Victorian period:

 Victorian Georgian
 Victorian Regency
 Filigree
 Italianate
 Tudor
 Free Gothic
 Rustic Gothic
 Free Classical
(The Arts and Crafts style and Queen Anne style are placed in the Federation period, from 1890 to 1915.)

See also

 Victorian architecture
 List of house styles
 Second Empire architecture
 Wesleyan Grove

References

Further reading
 
Osband, Linda (2003). Victorian Gothic House Style: An Architectural and Interior Design Source Book for Home Owners. Newton Abbot: David & Charles.  (originally published: 1991).
Yorke, Trevor (2005) The Victorian House Explained. Newbury: Countryside Books .

External links

 Victorian Houses
 The Haas-Lilienthal House, Victorian-era house and museum in San Francisco, California 
 Buffalo, New York Victorian era architecture and history
 Williamsport, Pennsylvania Victorian Homes
 Victorian Architecture and Hardware, History and Style
 Manchester, a Victorian City
 Hamilton, Ontario Canada Victorian Home Photographs
 Willimantic, CT Victorian Homes

House types
House types in the United Kingdom
House styles